Camden Football Club may refer to:
Camden Cats Senior Australian Football Club, an Australian rules football club in Sydney, Australia
Camden Football Club (South Australia), a former Australian rules football club in Adelaide, Australia

See also
PHOS Camden Football Club, an Australian rules football club in Adelaide, Australia